Yvonne Lue is a Jamaican doctor who works in the field of microbiology. Lue is one of the few Black women who have led clinical microbiology since the 1950-70s. She is the President for the New York City Branch of the American Society for Microbiology (ASM).

Early life 
Lue is a native of Jamaica. She did her bachelors in biology at LIU, Brooklyn from 1966 to 1970, her doctorate in microbiology at the Columbia Graduate School of Arts and Sciences from 1970 to 1976, and her post doctoral training in clinical microbiology from  1976-1978 at Columbia University College of Physicians and Surgeons, despite wide discrimination and hostility. She became involved with the American Society for Microbiology (ASM) early in her career.

Career
Lue recalls being the only historically underrepresented scientist that passed the ABMM examination in 1984. She was the director for the Microbiology & Virology departments at the Teterboro facility at the Quest Diagnostics from  1992 - 2007. She was part of the Planning Committee, UMDNJ Center for Continuing and Outreach Education, University Symposia in Clinical Laboratory Medicine from 2000-2008. She was the director for Long Island Jewish Medical Center, Clinical Laboratories in Microbiology from 2008-2010. She worked part-time as the Assistant Director in Microbiology at the Enzo Clinical Labs Inc. from 2008-2013. She was a Microbiology Consultant at aLab Services from 2012-2014.

Lue served on several ASM committees. She is an elected Member-at-Large representing branches for the Journal of Clinical Microbiology editorial board and the Council Policy Committee (CPC). She is the current President in the New York City Branch of ASM (American Society for Microbiology), where she actively mentors and trains local microbiologists.

References 

Living people
Year of birth missing (living people)
Place of birth missing (living people)
Jamaican microbiologists
Jamaican women scientists
Jamaican emigrants to the United States
American microbiologists
American women biologists
African-American biologists
Columbia Graduate School of Arts and Sciences alumni
20th-century American biologists
21st-century American biologists
20th-century American women scientists
21st-century American women scientists